Arms of Morpheus is the third studio album by the Dutch progressive metal band Kingfisher Sky. The album was originally released on the 24th of October, 2014 and peaked at #31 on the Netherlands album charts the week after its release. The funding for the album was obtained via an online crowdfunding campaign, which successfully raised enough money to get the album released.

The album; befitting its name referencing Greek god of sleep and dreams Morpheus; draws on themes of sleeping, dreams, coma, insomnia and myths amongst others.

Reception 

Arms of Morpheus received somewhat positive reviews from critics on release. Critics praised the album's broad range of musical influences and general musicianship of the band and their guests. While another critic praised the folk oriented elements of the album; they expressed disappointment at the perceived lack of dynamics in the vocals and expressed a dislike of the heavier metal elements of the album, describing them as "just not clicking with this record".

Track listing

Personnel 
Kingfisher Sky
 Ivar de Graaf - drums, percussion, acoustic guitar (additional), bouzouki, lyrics
 Judith Rijnveld - lead vocals, lyrics
 Edo van der Kolk - lead guitar, acoustic guitar
 Chris Henny - rhythm guitar
 Nick Verschoor - bass guitar
 Maaike Peterse - cello
 David Gutierrez Rojas - keyboards

Guest Musicians
 Kristoffer Gildenlöw - bass guitar 
 Ludo de Goeje - violin 
 Fieke Van Den Hurk - hurdy gurdy 
 Bouke Visser - tin whistle 
 Valerio Recenti - backing vocals 

Others
 Jochem Jacobs - mixing, mastering
 Joke Rijnveld-Stortenbeek - album artwork, layout
 Richard Hilgeman - photography

References

External links 
 Kingfisher Sky Official Website

2014 albums
Rock albums by Dutch artists